Joe Island may refer to:

Joe Island (Greenland), an uninhabited island in the Nares Strait, Greenland
Joe Island (Victoria), an uninhabited island in Western Port Bay, Victoria, Australia